Sandleheath is a village and civil parish about  west of Fordingbridge in the New Forest District  of  Hampshire, England.  It has a population of 663, increasing to 680 at the 2011 Census. It lies immediately north-east of the traditional (i.e. real) tripoint between Hampshire, Dorset and Wiltshire.

History
Sandle Manor is an Elizabethan manor house that was extended in 1900 and 1936.

The Church of England parish church of Saint Aldhelm was designed by the architect Charles Ponting and built in 1907.

Economy and amenities
The village has a small area of common land at its centre, a village shop and post office and a small industrial estate. Sandleheath has a Sea Scout group which has a hall in the village.

References

External links

Sandleheath Parish Council

Villages in Hampshire